Julius Lothar Meyer (19 August 1830 – 11 April 1895) was a German chemist. He was one of the pioneers in developing the earliest versions of the periodic table of the chemical elements. The Russian chemist Dmitri Mendeleev (his chief rival) and he had both worked with Robert Bunsen. Meyer never used his first given name and was known throughout his life simply as Lothar Meyer.

Career
Meyer was born in Varel, Germany (then part of the Duchy of Oldenburg). He was the son of Friedrich August Meyer, a physician, and Anna Biermann. After attending the Altes Gymnasium in Oldenburg, he studied medicine at the University of Zurich in 1851. Two years later, he studied pathology at the University of Würzburg as a student of Rudolf Virchow. At Zurich, he had studied under Carl Ludwig, which had prompted him to devote his attention to physiological chemistry. After graduating as a Doctor of Medicine from Würzburg in 1854, he went to the University of Heidelberg, where Robert Bunsen held the chair of chemistry. In 1858, he received a Ph.D. in chemistry from the University of Breslau with a thesis on the effects of carbon monoxide on the blood. With this interest in the physiology of respiration, he had recognized that oxygen combines with the hemoglobin in blood.

Influenced by the mathematical teaching of Gustav Kirchhoff, he took up the study of mathematical physics at the University of Königsberg under Franz Ernst Neumann and in 1859, after having received his habilitation (certification for university teaching), became Privatdozent in physics and chemistry at the University of Breslau. In 1866, Meyer accepted a post at the Eberswalde Forestry Academy at Neustadt-Eberswalde but two years later was appointed to a professorship at the Karlsruhe Polytechnic.

In 1872, Meyer was the first to suggest that the six carbon atoms in the benzene ring (that had been proposed a few years earlier by August Kekulé) were interconnected by single bonds only, the fourth valence of each carbon atom being directed toward the interior of the ring.

During the Franco-Prussian War, the Polytechnic was used as a hospital and Meyer took an active role in the care of the wounded. In 1876, Meyer became Professor of Chemistry at the University of Tübingen, where he served until his death from a stroke on 11 April 1895 at the age of 64.

Periodic table
Meyer is best known for his part in the periodic classification of the elements. He noted, as John A. R. Newlands did in England, that if the elements were arranged in the order of their atomic weights, they fell into groups of similar chemical and physical properties repeated at periodic intervals. According to him, if the atomic weights were plotted as ordinates and the atomic volumes as abscissae—the curve obtained a series of maxima and minima—the most electro-positive elements appearing at the peaks of the curve in the order of their atomic weights.

His book, Die modernen Theorien der Chemie, which he began writing in Breslau in 1862 and which was published two years later, contained an early version of the periodic table containing 28 elements, classified elements into six families by their valence—for the first time, elements had been grouped according to their valence. Works on organizing the elements by atomic weight, until then had been stymied by the widespread use of equivalent weights for the elements, rather than atomic weights.

He published articles about classification table of the elements in horizontal form (1864) and vertical form (1870), in which the series of periods are properly ended by an element of the alkaline earth metal group.

Table of Meyer, 1864

Table of Meyer, 1870 

In 1869, Dmitri Mendeleev published a periodic table of all elements known at that time (he later predicted several new elements to complete the table, and corrected some atomic weights). A few months later, Meyer published a paper that included a revised version of his 1864 table that now included virtually all of the known elements, which was similar to the table published by Mendeleev:

Meyer had developed his fuller periodic table independently, but he acknowledged Mendeleev's priority. Included in Meyer's paper was a line chart of atomic volumes as a function of atomic weights, showing graphically the periodicity of the elements. Like Mendeleev, he also included predictions of future elements, but unlike Mendeleev did not emphasize these predictions nor suggest details of the physical and chemical properties of the future elements.

In 1882, both Meyer and Mendeleev received the Davy Medal from the Royal Society in recognition of their work on the Periodic Law.

The mineral lotharmeyerite, was discovered in 1983 and named in recognition of Meyer's work on the Periodic Law. The type locality is the Ojuela mine, Mapimí, Durango, Mexico. Four closely related minerals have been described since 1983: ferrilotharmeyerite,  (1992); cobaltlotharmeyerite,  (1997); nickellotharmeyerite,  (1999); and manganlotharmeyerite,  (2002).

Personal life
Meyer married Johanna Volkmann in 1866.

Tribute
On 19 August 2020, Google celebrated his 190th birthday with a Google Doodle.

See also
Dimitri Mendeleev
History of the periodic table

Notes

References
 
 
 Harald Kluge and Ingrid Kaestner, Ein Wegbereiter der physikalischen Chemie im 19. Jahrhundert, Julius Lothar Meyer (1830–1895) (Aachen: Shaker-Verlag, 2014).
 Otto Kraetz, "Lothar Meyer," Neue Deutsche Biographie, 17 (1994), 304–06.

External links

 
 Periodic table according to Lothar Meyer (1870)
 Video of a talk by Michael Gordin titled "Periodicity, Priority, Pedagogy: Mendeleev and Lothar Meyer"
 The Internet Database of Periodic Tables. Chemogenesis web book.
 

1830 births
1895 deaths
Corresponding members of the Saint Petersburg Academy of Sciences
Academic staff of the Eberswalde University for Sustainable Development
19th-century German chemists
Academic staff of the Karlsruhe Institute of Technology
People from Oldenburg (state)
People from Varel
Academic staff of the University of Tübingen
University of Würzburg alumni
People involved with the periodic table